Agyneta merretti is a species of spider in the family Linyphiidae (sheet weavers) found in Angola. It was described by G. H. Locket in 1968.

References

Endemic fauna of Angola
merretti
Spiders of Africa
Spiders described in 1968